Ornixola is a genus of moths in the family Gracillariidae.

Species
Ornixola caudulatella (Zeller, 1839)

External links
Global Taxonomic Database of Gracillariidae (Lepidoptera)

Gracillariinae
Gracillarioidea genera